Michel Disdier (born 10 February 1974) is a French professional racing driver - nickname : "a frenchman in Nascar". He has raced motorcycles in Europe and stock cars in Canada and the United States, running in the NASCAR Canadian Tire Series and NASCAR Camping World Truck Series.

Racing career
Disdier first raced motorcycles in Europe, winning the French Moto-Cross Endurance 125cc Championship at age 16. In 1993, he won the Formula Ford B French title, and six years later, the Formula France Championship. After becoming an exchange student to the United States, with his host family living in North Carolina, a popular NASCAR state, Disdier became interested in stock car racing, and made his debut in the NASCAR Canadian Tire Series in 2007 in the NAPA Autopro 200 at Circuit Gilles Villeneuve for Trident Racing, finishing 29th. In 2008, Disdier joined Bowsher Motorsports to run in the ARCA Re/MAX Series, finishing 13th in his first race at Salem Speedway. The following year, Disdier was entered for ten races with Bowsher in the No. 21 Ford, running two in 2008 and the remaining eight in 2009. Disdier returned to ARCA in 2013 with Cunningham Motorsports at Daytona International Speedway, finishing 11th, a career-high.

In January 2014, Disdier was allowed by NASCAR to race on superspeedways, and tested in the Camping World Truck Series' Preseason Thunder at Daytona in the No. 07 of SS-Green Light Racing, splitting the truck with Jimmy Weller III and Todd Peck. He was later signed by the team to race in the season-opening NextEra Energy Resources 250 with SS-Green Light owner Bobby Dotter serving as spotter, making Disdier the first Frenchman to race in NASCAR since the 1970s. After starting 33rd, Disdier finished 24th, 17 laps behind race winner Kyle Busch. He returned to the team in 2016 for the Daytona race and avoided wrecks to finish 11th. He later joined Young's Motorsports in 2018 for a race at Las Vegas Motor Speedway, in which he finished 19th.

Motorsports career results

NASCAR
(key) (Bold – Pole position awarded by qualifying time. Italics – Pole position earned by points standings or practice time. * – Most laps led.)

Camping World Truck Series

Canadian Tire Series

 Season still in progress
 Ineligible for series points

ARCA Racing Series
(key) (Bold – Pole position awarded by qualifying time. Italics – Pole position earned by points standings or practice time. * – Most laps led.)

 Season still in progress
 Ineligible for series points

References

External links
 

Living people
1974 births
Sportspeople from Nice
French racing drivers
Formula Ford drivers
ARCA Menards Series drivers
NASCAR drivers